Chalmer Augustus Ault (July 10, 1900 – May 18, 1979) was a professional American football player in the National Football League for the Cleveland Bulldogs. Prior to his professional career, Ault played at the college level for the West Virginia Wesleyan Bobcats.

References
Stats at Pro Football Reference

1900 births
1979 deaths
Players of American football from Ohio
West Virginia Wesleyan Bobcats football players
Cleveland Bulldogs players